Clathrina sinusarabica is a species of calcareous sponge from Egypt.

References 

World Register of Marine Species entry

Clathrina
Animals described in 2003
Invertebrates of Egypt